Take You Higher may refer to:
 Take You Higher (Goodwill and Hook n Sling song)
 Take You Higher (Wilkinson song)
 Take You Higher (album), a 1985 album by Dynamic Hepnotics

See also
 I Want to Take You Higher, a song by Sly and the Family Stone